John Pirie of Canterbury, Kent (died 1402 or after), was an English politician.

Nothing is recorded of his family. Pirie was a Member of Parliament for Canterbury, Kent in 1401.

References

14th-century births
15th-century deaths
People from Canterbury
English MPs 1401